The Springfield Armory EMP is a semi-automatic pistol based on the classic M1911 design and manufactured by Springfield Armory, Inc. Whereas the M1911 uses the .45 ACP cartridge, the EMP uses smaller 9×19mm Parabellum or .40 S&W cartridges. It has been reengineered to make it smaller and lighter than its parent firearm, and is marketed as a "short-action 1911". EMP stands for "Enhanced Micro Pistol". It is similar to the Colt Defender and Para-Ordnance Slim Hawg.

Design
Seventeen parts of the M1911 were reduced in size for the design of the EMP.  The slide and frame were both shortened, necessitating changes to the extractor, firing pin, firing pin spring, and trigger bow, as well as the plunger tube.  The grip frame circumference has also been reduced  due to the magazine itself being made shorter, front-to-back.

Versions
In addition to the standard EMP model with a  barrel, versions with  barrels were introduced in 2016.

References

External links

Springfield EMP 9mm from Hickok45 via YouTube
Springfield EMP 4 Lightweight Champion 9mm from Hickok45 via YouTube

Semi-automatic pistols of the United States
9mm Parabellum semi-automatic pistols
.40 S&W semi-automatic pistols
Springfield Armory Inc. firearms